The NWA Canadian Tag Team Championship is a National Wrestling Alliance-sanctioned tag team professional wrestling championship based mainly in the Extreme Canadian Championship Wrestling promotion, although the title has been contested for in the Canadian Wrestling Federation, NWA Green Mountain and NWA Quebec. The NWA Canadian Tag Team titles will be defended under the NWA Atlantic Banner in Atlantic Canada. The titles are owned by Torture Chamber Pro Wrestling Dojo along with NWA British Commonwealth Heavyweight Championship.

There had previously been a version of the NWA Canadian Tag Team Championship used in NWA All-Star Wrestling from 1962 to 1985. The current version began in 1998.

Title history

See also
List of National Wrestling Alliance championships
Elite Canadian Championship Wrestling
NWA Canadian Open Tag Team Championship
NWA Canadian Tag Team Championship (Calgary version)
NWA Canadian Tag Team Championship (Vancouver version)

References

National Wrestling Alliance championships
Tag team wrestling championships
Canadian professional wrestling championships